Mark Homer (born 1973) is an English actor and writer. He is best known for playing Tony Hills in the popular British soap opera EastEnders from 1995 to 1999. His subsequent work includes guest appearances in Silent Witness and Spine Chillers, both also for the BBC.  In 2000, Homer appeared in a play called Boxed at London's Riverside Studios, which he co-wrote with Carolina Giammetta (who also starred in the play) and EastEnders director Ray Kilby (the play's director).

Career
Homer's first television acting role was playing Tony Hills on EastEnders. He worked on the soap from 1995 to 1999.. On playing the role, Homer (who is straight) told the Huffington Post in 2016: "My biggest challenge was making Tony Hills as believable as I could [...] I used to get so many letters from vulnerable teenagers who felt totally alone in the world. All of a sudden there was a person on the telly who they could identify with. I felt some kind of pressure to make sure everything was well represented. It was too important to get wrong."

Personal life
Homer is married to actress Jane Denney and they have children. He is an Arsenal F.C. supporter.

Filmography

Films

Television

References

External links
 
 Official EastEnders site

Living people
English male soap opera actors
English male film actors
English male stage actors
Alumni of the Academy Drama School
1973 births